Tomasso Amici was an Italian sculptor active in Cremona in the late 15th century. He worked in the style of the thirteenth-century sculptor Bramanto Sacchi. He is known for having sculpted the reliefs in altar of St Nicolas (1495) in a Gothic style in the Duomo di Cremona, where he worked with Fra Mabila de Mazo (Francesco Majo?).

Sources

15th-century Italian sculptors
Italian male sculptors